These are the international rankings of Bhutan

International rankings

References

Bhutan